The Broadcast Committee of Advertising Practice (BCAP) is a regulatory body of the United Kingdom which has responsible for writing and reviewing the UK Code of Broadcast Advertising. It was established under the Communications Act 2003 and has responsibility to the Office of Communications (Ofcom). BCAP's remit is to ensure that advertising on radio and television in the United Kingdom are not misleading, that they do not cause harm or offence to viewers and listeners, and that they stay within the boundaries of taste and decency.

See also 
 Committee of Advertising Practice

References

External links
Broadcast Committee of Advertising Practice

Advertising in the United Kingdom
Organizations established in 2003
2003 establishments in the United Kingdom
Radio organisations in the United Kingdom
Television organisations in the United Kingdom
Advertising regulation
Regulation in the United Kingdom